Tetyana Verezubova is a Ukrainian former football striker. She played for Energiya Voronezh, Ryazan VDV, Lada Togliatti and Rossiyanka in the Russian Championship.

She was a member of the Soviet and Ukrainian national teams.

References

1972 births
Living people
Footballers from Kyiv
Women's association football forwards
Soviet women's footballers
Soviet Union women's international footballers
Ukrainian women's footballers
Ukraine women's international footballers
WFC Dynamo Kyiv players
WFC Alina Kyiv players
WFC Donchanka Donetsk players
WFC Olimp Kyiv players
Ukrainian expatriate women's footballers
Ukrainian expatriate sportspeople in Russia
Expatriate women's footballers in Russia
Dual internationalists (women's football)
FC Lada Togliatti (women) players
Ryazan-VDV players
FC Energy Voronezh players
WFC Rossiyanka players